Konstantin Evgenevich Petryashov (born 16 December 1984, in Leningrad) is a Russian sprinter.

Personal bests

International competitions

References

Living people
1984 births
Athletes from Saint Petersburg
Russian male sprinters
Universiade gold medalists in athletics (track and field)
Universiade gold medalists for Russia
Competitors at the 2011 Summer Universiade
Medalists at the 2009 Summer Universiade
World Athletics Championships athletes for Russia
Russian Athletics Championships winners